Babi ngepet is boar demon in Indonesian mythology. Babi ngepet are commonly known in Java and Bali.

Outline
According to local myth, the creature is believed to be the manifestation of a person practising pesugihan babi black magic. Pesugihan is derived from the Javanese word sugih meaning "rich". It is a kind of magic to help people become rich instantly, but in exchange they must sacrifice something. In this case they must sacrifice their humanity; allowing themselves to be transformed into a boar for a period of time, or allowing themselves to be possessed by a boar demon. The human-animal transformation is similar to shapeshifting or the werewolf concept in the West.

Transformation
Some of the myths told about a man enveloped in black robes before miraculously turning into this creature. After the transformation, the demon boar roams around the village, scratching its body against the wall, door, cupboard, or furniture. Magically the belongings of the villagers, such as money, gold, and jewellery will disappear and be magically carried away by the Babi Ngepet. If the mission was successful, by the time Babi Ngepet safely returns home and transforms back into their human form, the black robes will be filled with the stolen money or jewellery.

The person that practices Babi Ngepet black magic needs assistance from another person. The assistant's task is to stay home and guard the lit candle floating on a basin of water, while the Babi Ngepet is in action. If the candle flame is shaking, fading or almost out, it is the sign that the Babi Ngepet is in danger, caught in the act by villagers, or turned back into their human form. Because of this belief, Javanese villagers often chase or even kill any boar wandering around the village at night.

Interpretation
The skeptical view is that it was probably a traditional way to explain the unexplainable loss of fortune or a mysterious theft in the village, by blaming the wild boar roaming the village in the night. Or probably it was a means of traditional pest control; to get rid of wild boars from eating and destroying rice fields or barns. The association of the boar with magic concerning fortune probably originated from Javanese pre-Islamic and pre-Hindu-Buddhist beliefs that associate the boar with domestic richness, fortune and prosperity, similar to its connections with Celengan, which means piggy bank in Javanese.  The word Celengan is derived from word Celeng which means boar.

See also
 Aswang
 Tuyul
 Werewolf

References

Javanese mythology
Shapeshifting
Mythological pigs
Indonesian legendary creatures